The Future Foundation School is a Kolkata-based K-12 school founded in 1981. It follows the syllabus of the Council for the Indian School Certificate Examinations. It is guided by the principles of Sri Aurobindo and Mira Alfassa.
Students are prepared for the Indian Certificate of Secondary Education (ICSE) and Indian School Certificate (ISC).
Humanities and Science Streams are offered at the ISC level. The Future Foundation School is an initiative of the Sri Aurobindo Institute of Culture. It is a co-ed school and the medium of instruction is English.
The school is accredited to the National Accreditation Board for Education and Training, under the Quality Council of India. It is the first school in India and one of the first few in Asia to receive the LabelFranc Education accreditation. This quality mark is awarded to academic institutions which have the goal to promote a system of bilingual teaching to students by the French Ministry of Europe and Foreign Affairs.
The school has been ranked the 24th best co-ed school in India by EducationWorld for the year 2019-20 and is also the recipient of Leading Schools Corp.

History 
TFFS was promoted in 1981 Joya Mitter (1936-1999), a Kolkata-based social activist, with the aid and advice of P.K. Bhattacharya (1905-1984), a trustee of the Sri Aurobindo Ashram, Pondicherry. The duo was introduced to Lakshmi Devi, a disciple of Sri Aurobindo, by The Mother. Lakshmi Devi donated her sprawling home in Tollygunge, Kolkata to the ashram, which invited Joya Mitter to establish TFFS on its premises. Joya Mitter served as the founder-principal of the school in its formative years and modelled it on the ancient gurukul system of teaching. After her death in 1999, Ranjan Mitter was appointed as the principal of the school.

Notable alumni 
 Monali Thakur 
 Rwitobroto Mukherjee

See also
Education in India
List of schools in India
Education in West Bengal

References

Schools affiliated with the Sri Aurobindo Ashram
Primary schools in West Bengal
High schools and secondary schools in Kolkata
Educational institutions established in 1981
1981 establishments in West Bengal